Charles Edwin Hatcher  (January 21, 1942 – April 2, 2003), known by his stage name Edwin Starr, was an American singer and songwriter. Starr was famous for his Norman Whitfield-produced Motown singles of the 1970s, most notably the number-one hit "War".

Born in Nashville and raised in Cleveland, Ohio, he later lived in Detroit while singing for Ric-Tic and Motown Records. He was backed by the band that became known as "Black Merda". Hawkins and Veasey of the group played on most of his early hits on the Ric Tic Label. Starr's songs "Twenty-Five Miles" and "Stop the War Now" were also major successes, in 1969 and 1971 respectively. In the 1970s Starr's base shifted to the United Kingdom, where he continued to produce music, and resided until his death.

Early life
Charles Edwin Hatcher was born in Nashville, Tennessee, on January 21, 1942. He and his cousins, soul singers Roger and Willie Hatcher, moved to Cleveland, Ohio, where they were raised.

In 1957, Hatcher formed a doo-wop group, the Future Tones, and began his singing career. However after just one single, he was called up for military service in the United States Army for three years, where he was posted to Europe, following the end of his service he decided to make music his career, and joined the musical group of Bill Doggett. Hatcher, adopted the name Edwin Starr at the suggestion of Doggett's manager Don Briggs, and made his solo recording debut in 1965 for the Detroit record company Ric-Tic.

Career
The song that launched his career was "Agent Double-O-Soul" (1965), a reference to the James Bond films, already popular at the time. Other early hits included "Headline News", "Back Street", and "Stop Her on Sight (S.O.S.)". While at Ric-Tic, he wrote the song, "Oh, How Happy", a number 12 Billboard Hot 100 hit in 1966 for The Shades of Blue (he would go on to release a version of the song with Blinky in 1969) and sang lead for the Holidays on their number 12 R&B hit, "I'll Love You Forever". At Motown he recorded a string of singles before enjoying international success with "Twenty-Five Miles", which he co-wrote with producers Johnny Bristol and Harvey Fuqua. It peaked at number 6 in both the Hot 100 and R&B Charts in 1969.

It was when Motown's Berry Gordy became frustrated with smaller labels like Ric-Tic stealing some of the success of his company that he bought out the label. Many of Starr's Ric-Tic songs (subsequently owned by Motown) like "Back Street" and "Headline News" became favored northern soul classics. His early Ric-Tic hit "Stop Her on Sight (S.O.S.)", was reissued in Britain (with "Headline News" as its B-side) in 1968, and it performed better than the original release on the UK Chart, surpassing the original number 35 and peaking at number 11. His 1970 song "Time" also helped to establish him as a prominent artist on the northern soul scene.

The biggest hit of Starr's career, which cemented his reputation, was the Vietnam War protest song "War" (1970). Starr's intense vocals transformed a Temptations album track into a number one chart success, which spent three weeks in the top position on the U.S. Billboard charts, an anthem for the antiwar movement and a cultural milestone that continues to resound in movie soundtracks and hip hop music samples. It sold over three million copies, and was awarded a gold disc. "War" appeared on both of Starr's War & Peace album and its follow-up, Involved, produced by Norman Whitfield. Involved also featured another song of similar construction titled "Stop the War Now", which was a minor hit in its own right. Music critic Robert Christgau called the latter album "Norman Whitfield's peak production". His backing singers during this time were Total Concept Unlimited, who later became Rose Royce.

Starr continued to record, most notably the song "Hell Up in Harlem" for the 1974 film Hell Up in Harlem, which was the sequel to Black Caesar, an earlier hit with a soundtrack by James Brown. In 1979, Starr reappeared on the charts with a pair of disco hits, "(Eye-to-Eye) Contact" and "H.A.P.P.Y. Radio". "Contact" was the more successful of the two, peaking at number 65 on the US pop chart, number 13 on the R&B chart, number 1 on the dance chart, and number 6 on the UK Singles Chart. "H.A.P.P.Y. Radio" was also a top ten hit in the UK, reaching number 9 on the chart in mid-1979. By now, he had joined the well-established disco boom and had further singles on 20th Century Records. Over the years, he released tracks on a variety of labels, including Avatar, Calibre, 10 Records, Motown (a return to his former label for a 1989 remix of "25 Miles"), Streetwave (where he recorded 1984's "Marvin", a tribute to Marvin Gaye) and Hippodrome (a division of Peter Stringfellow's Hippodrome nightclub). His Starr café empire still enjoys success in and around Essex.

In 1985, Starr released "It Ain't Fair". Despite garnering the attention of many in the soul and dance clubs, it fell short of becoming a major hit (managing number 56 on the UK Chart). "It Ain't Fair", along with several other singles released around the same time, appeared on Starr's Through the Grapevine album, which was not released until 1990. Starr appeared on the charity number one single "Let It Be" by Ferry Aid in 1987. Later that year, Starr teamed up with the Stock, Aitken and Waterman (SAW) production company for the club hit, "Whatever Makes Our Love Grow". Starr expressed dissatisfaction with the process of making the record, complaining that the producers treated him as an amateur.

In 1989, a number 17 UK hit by the Cookie Crew called "Got to Keep On" sampled a portion of "25 Miles". This track was then featured on a 1990 dance medley made for the BRIT Awards, which made number 2 in the UK Singles Chart. A club mix of various artists, it included the previous years remix of "25 Miles".

In 1989, Starr also joined Ian Levine's Motorcity Records, releasing six singles and the album Where Is the Sound, as well as co-writing several songs for other artists on the label. Starr resurfaced briefly in 2000 to team up with the UK band Utah Saints to record a new version of "Funky Music Sho' 'Nuff Turns Me On". He appeared again in 2002 to record a song with the British musician Jools Holland, singing "Snowflake Boogie" on Holland's compact disc More Friends; and to record another track with Utah Saints, a so-far-unreleased version of his number one hit "War"—his last recording.

In 1995, Starr featured in Blue Juice, a 1995 British drama film as a soul singer named Ossie Sands. The songs featured were recorded by Starr for the film. The film has the added attraction of being possibly the first film to include Northern Soul as a sub-plot.

In late 2002, Edwin Starr appeared with many R&B stars on the "Rhythm, Love, and Soul" edition of the PBS series American Soundtrack. His performance of "25 Miles" was included on the accompanying live album that was released in 2004.

Personal life and death
Starr remained a hero on England's northern soul circuit and moved to England in 1983, continuing to live there for the remainder of his life. He based himself in the English Midlands, living for many years at Pooley Hall at Polesworth, Warwickshire, before moving to Bramcote in Nottinghamshire.

Starr died on April 2, 2003, from a heart attack at his Nottinghamshire home. He was 61. He is buried at Wilford Hill Cemetery in Nottingham. He was survived by his long term partner Jean, and by his son and daughter from earlier relationships.

Honours
Edwin Starr was inducted into the inaugural class of the Official Rhythm & Blues Music Hall of Fame at Cleveland State University in August 2013.

Starr was inducted into the Michigan Rock and Roll Legends Hall of Fame in 2017.

Starr is one of the subjects of a mural in Beeston, Nottingham which is not far from where he lived later in life.

Discography

Albums

Singles

References

External links
 Official site
 
 
 Edwin Starr interview by Pete Lewis, 'Blues & Soul' 10/92
 [ Edwin Starr] at AllMusic
 

1942 births
2003 deaths
American dance musicians
Motown artists
Singers from Nashville, Tennessee
American expatriates in the United Kingdom
American soul musicians
Northern soul musicians
Ric-Tic Records artists
People from Bramcote
20th-century African-American male singers
21st-century African-American male singers